Sterol regulatory element-binding transcription factor 1 (SREBF1) also known as sterol regulatory element-binding protein 1 (SREBP-1) is a protein that in humans is encoded by the SREBF1 gene.

This gene is located within the Smith–Magenis syndrome region on chromosome 17. Two transcript variants encoding different isoforms have been found for this gene.  The isoforms are SREBP-1a and SREBP-1c (the latter also called ADD-1). SREBP-1a is expressed in the intestine and spleen, whereas SREBP-1c is mainly expressed in liver, muscle, and fat (among other tissues).

Expression 

The proteins encoded by this gene are transcription factors that bind to a sequence in the promoter of different genes, called sterol regulatory element-1 (SRE1).  This element is a decamer (oligomer with ten subunits) flanking the LDL receptor gene and other genes involved in, for instance, sterol biosynthesis. The protein is synthesized as a precursor that is attached to the nuclear membrane and endoplasmic reticulum. Following cleavage, the mature protein translocates to the nucleus and activates transcription by binding to the SRE1. Sterols inhibit the cleavage of the precursor, and the mature nuclear form is rapidly catabolized, thereby reducing transcription. The protein is a member of the basic helix-loop-helix-leucine zipper (bHLH-Zip) transcription factor family.

SREBP-1a regulates genes related to lipid and cholesterol production and its activity is regulated by sterol levels in the cell.

SREBP-1a and SREBP-1c are both encoded by the same gene, but are transcribed by different promoters. For animals in a fasted state, SREBP-1c expression is suppressed in the liver, but a high carbohydrate meal (by insulin release) strongly induces SREBP-1c expression.

Function 
SREBP-1 plays a key role in the induction of lipogenesis by the liver.  mTORC1 is activated by insulin (a hormone of nutrient abundance) leading to increased production of SREBP-1c, which facilitates storage of fatty acids (excess nutrients) as triglycerides.

Clinical relevance 
SREBP-1c regulates genes required for glucose metabolism and fatty acid and lipid production and its expression is induced by insulin.   Insulin-stimulated SREBP-1c increases glycolysis by activation of glucokinase enzyme, and increases lipogenesis (conversion of carbohydrates into fatty acids). Insulin stimulation of SREBP-1c is mediated by liver X receptor (LXR) and mTORC1.

High blood levels of insulin due to insulin resistance often leads to steatosis in the liver because of SREBP-1 activation. Suppression of SREBP-1c by sirtuin 1 or by other means protects against development of fatty liver.

SREBP-1 is highly activated in cancers because tumor cells require lipids for cell membranes, second messengers, and energy.

Interactions 

SREBF1 has been shown to interact with:
 CREB-binding protein, 
 DAX1 
 LMNA, and
 TWIST2. 
 BHLHE40 
 BHLHE41

See also 
 Sterol regulatory element-binding protein

References

Further reading

External links 
 
 

Transcription factors